Full Strike is a 2015 Hong Kong sports comedy film directed by Derek Kwok and Henri Wong. The film was released on 7 May 2015.

Cast 
 Josie Ho as Ng Kau-sau (aka Beast Ng)
 Ekin Cheng as Lau Dan
 Ronald Cheng as Ng Kau-cheung (aka Suck Nipple Cheung)
 Tse Kwan-ho as Ng Kau-chun
 Andrew Lam as Champion Chik
 Edmond Leung as Lam Chiu
 Wilfred Lau as Ma Kun
 Siu Yam-yam as Grandma Mui
 Eric Kwok as Wong Lung-wai

Guest appearance 
 Grace Yip as Fung
 Michael Tse as Inspector Cheung
 Philip Keung as Brother Crazy Dog
 JBS@24HERBS as Gangster
 Phat Chan@24HERBS as Police League' Team
 Kit Leung@24HERBS as Police League' Team
 Stephanie Che as Madam
 Jo Kuk as Police officer
 Vincent Kok as Police League' Team
 Matt Chow as Benny Yiu
 Calvin Choi as other team players
 Edward Huang as other team players
 Helen To as Audience
 Bao Chunlai as himself
 Wang Lin as herself
 Yang Di as Alien
 Bob Lam as Anchor
 Kabby Hui as Anchor
 Harriet Yeung as Lancy Lam

Box office 
As of 3 June 2015, the film has grossed a total of HK$12.2 million at the Hong Kong box office after four weekends.

References

External links 
 
Full Strike Official Trailer

2015 action comedy films
2010s sports comedy films
2015 films
Badminton films
2010s Cantonese-language films
Films directed by Derek Kwok
Hong Kong action comedy films
Hong Kong sports comedy films
Sports action films
2010s Hong Kong films